In the Greco-Roman world, the grammarian was responsible for the second stage in the traditional education system, after a boy had learned his basic Greek and Latin. The job of the grammarian was to teach the ancient poets such as Homer and Virgil, and the correct way of speaking before a boy moved on to study under the rhetor. Despite often humble origins, some grammarians went on to achieve elevated positions in Rome, though few enjoyed financial success.

Grammar
In about 100 B.C., Dionysius Thrax defined grammar as an "acquired expertise of the general usage of poets and prose writers". He identified six elements to the field:

Accurate reading aloud
Explanation of literary devices
Comments on subject matter
Comments on etymologies
Working out analogical regularities
The critical study of literature.

Nearly two hundred years later, Quintilian defined the subject as the knowledge of proper speaking and the explication of the poets.

Position
Some grammarians achieved elevated positions in the Roman world and enjoyed preferential treatment, despite their relatively lowly job and often humble origins. They were exempt from local taxes in Rome for instance. By tutoring the children of the wealthy, grammarians could meet and become associated with prominent families in Rome. Marcus Antonius Gnipho was part of the household of Julius Caesar. This despite the fact that some noted grammarians had originally been brought to Rome as captives. Twelve of the twenty grammarians described by Suetonius in De Illustribus Grammaticis had been slaves.

Latin grammarians, like their Greek equivalents, came from all over the Roman Empire, including Syria, Spain, Gaul, Athens and Italy.

See also
 Philologist
 Alexandrine grammarians
 Biblical grammarians
 Linguist

References

Further reading
Suetonius, De Illustribus Grammaticis ("Lives Of The Grammarians") Twenty brief lives.

External links
 

Education in classical antiquity